Harry Fowler Mear (1888–1985) was a British screenwriter. He spent a number of years at Twickenham Film Studios where his work has been described as "competent but uninspired".

Partial filmography

 The Cost of a Kiss (1917)
 What Next? (1928)
 The Silent House (1929)
 Would You Believe It! (1929)
 Red Pearls (1930)
 You'd Be Surprised! (1930)
 The Last Hour (1930)
 The Lyons Mail (1931)
 Black Coffee (1931)
 Third Time Lucky (1931)
 Splinters in the Navy (1931)
 The Happy Ending (1931)
 The Professional Guest (1931)
 Number, Please (1931)
 Deadlock (1931)
 Once Bitten (1932)
 The Crooked Lady (1932)
 The Marriage Bond (1932)
 The Lacquered Box (1932)
 In a Monastery Garden (1932)
 Double Dealing (1932)
 The Ghost Camera (1933)
 The Shadow (1933)
 I Lived with You (1933)
 His Grace Gives Notice (1933)
 This Week of Grace (1933)
 The Umbrella (1933)
 Home, Sweet Home (1933)
 The Wandering Jew (1933)
 Lord Edgeware Dies (1934)
 Music Hall (1934)
 Whispering Tongues (1934)
 The Admiral's Secret (1934)
 The Broken Melody (1934)
 Lily of Killarney (1934)
 Say It with Flowers (1934)
 Bella Donna (1934)
 The Night Club Queen (1934)
 Flood Tide (1934)
 The Man Who Changed His Name (1934)
 The Triumph of Sherlock Holmes (1935)
 She Shall Have Music (1935)
  Squibs (1935)
 D'Ye Ken John Peel? (1935)
 Inside the Room (1935)
 Department Store (1935)
 The Morals of Marcus (1935)
 Three Witnesses (1935)
 Scrooge (1935)
 The Last Journey (1936)
 Eliza Comes to Stay (1936)
 Dusty Ermine (1936)
 In the Soup (1936)
 Talking Feet (1937)
 The Vicar of Bray (1937)
 Riding High (1937)
 Death Croons the Blues (1937)
 Song of the Forge (1937)
 Underneath the Arches (1937)
 Stepping Toes (1938)

References

Bibliography
 Richards, Jeffrey (ed.). The Unknown 1930s: An Alternative History of the British Cinema, 1929- 1939. I.B. Tauris & Co, 1998.

External links

1888 births
1985 deaths
People from Edmonton, London
British male screenwriters
20th-century British screenwriters